Theodore Gaillard Thomas (November 21, 1831 – February 28, 1903) was an American gynæcologist, born in Edisto Island, S. C., and educated in Charleston. He studied in Europe, principally in Paris and Dublin, in 1853-55, and began the practice of his profession in New York.  He was a lecturer in New York University (1855–63), and professor in the Columbia University College of Physicians and Surgeons, New York City (1863–1889, where he held the chair of gynæcology when he retired.  Thomas was the first to perform and publish an account of vaginal ovariotomy (1870).  He wrote Diseases of Women (Philadelphia, 1868), which passed through six editions in English, and was translated into French, German, Spanish, Chinese, and Italian. He died at Thomasville, Georgia in 1903.

Terms
 Thomas pessary — A form of uterine pessary  
Dorland's - 1938

See Also

Southampton summer colony

References

External links
1894 bio with portrait
 

Writers from New York City
Writers from Charleston, South Carolina
American obstetricians
American medical writers
American male non-fiction writers
1831 births
1903 deaths
People from Edisto Island, South Carolina